Crenicichla geayi, also known as the half-banded pike cichlid, is a species of cichlid native to South America. It is found in the Orinoco River basin and in the Portuguesa River basin.

The fish is named in honor of pharmacist and natural history collector Martin François Geay (1859-1910), who collected the type specimen.

References

Kullander, S.O., 2003. Cichlidae (Cichlids). p. 605-654. In R.E. Reis, S.O. Kullander and C.J. Ferraris, Jr. (eds.) Checklist of the Freshwater Fishes of South and Central America. Porto Alegre: EDIPUCRS, Brasil.

geayi
Taxa named by Jacques Pellegrin
Fish described in 1903